Homecare (also spelled as home care) is health care or supportive care provided by a professional caregiver in the individual home where the patient or client is living, as opposed to care provided in group accommodations like clinics or nursing home. Homecare is also known as domiciliary care, social care or in-home care. It comprises a range of activities, especially paramedical aid by nurses and assistance in daily living for ill, disabled or elderly people.

Clients receiving home health care may incur lower costs, receive equal to better care, and have increased satisfaction in contrast to other settings.

Occasionally, palliative and end-of-life care can be provided through home health nursing.

Home health nurses may assist patients with activities of daily living (ADLs) such as bathing, toileting, and feeding, or they direct and supervise the aide in providing ADL care. Nurses keep track of vital signs, carry out physician orders, draw blood, document the tasks they perform and the patient's health status, and communicate between the patient, family, and physician.

Some nurses travel to multiple homes per day and provide short visits to multiple patients, while others may stay with one patient for a certain amount of time per day.

See also 
 Aging in place
 Assisted living
 Home care in the United Kingdom
 Home care in the United States
 Healthcare in India

References

Caregiving